The .38-55 Winchester cartridge (actually .3775 caliber), also known as .38-55 WCF and .38-55 Ballard, was introduced in 1876 by Ballard. It was used by Marlin Firearms from 1875 on for various single-shot target rifles and their 1893 lever-action rifle. It was later offered by Winchester in its Model 1894. Winchester continued to use the round in various rifles until about 1940, and also used it in a few commemorative editions of rifles since then. In addition, Marlin offered it in some 336s, and it was used in non-lever action rifles such as the Remington-Lee bolt-action.

A modernized version of the cartridge debuted in 1978 as the .375 Winchester, designed with higher pressures and to be used in modern firearms only. It is not safe to fire factory .375 Winchester ammunition in rifles chambered in .38-55, especially in older examples. The brass is very similar (shortened by approximately 1 mm (.0394 in)), but using modern, higher pressure .375 loads in an older rifle could cause serious injury to the shooter.

The .38-55 is used to hunt black bear and deer at moderate ranges and is also used in cowboy action shooting side matches.

See also
 .360 Buckhammer
 .375 Winchester
 List of rifle cartridges
 Table of handgun and rifle cartridges

Notes

External links
 The .38-55 is back! - John Taffin - Sixguns.com
 .38-55 Winchester - The Reload Bench
 .38-55 Winchester - ChuckHawks.com
 - Jean Mario Charest - Page personal

Pistol and rifle cartridges
Winchester Repeating Arms Company cartridges